The 2020–21 Liberty Flames men's basketball team represented Liberty University in the 2020–21 NCAA Division I men's basketball season. The team plays its home games in Lynchburg, Virginia for the inaugural season at Liberty Arena, with a capacity of 4,000. The team was led by Ritchie McKay, who was in the sixth season of his current stint as head coach and eighth overall. Liberty was a third-year member of the ASUN Conference. They finished the season 23-6, 11-2 in ASUN Play to finish in ASUN regular season champions. They defeated Kennesaw State, Stetson, and North Alabama to be champions of the ASUN tournament. They received the ASUN’s automatic bid to the NCAA tournament where they lost in the first round to Oklahoma State.

Previous season
The Flames finished the 2019–20 season 30–4, 13–3 in ASUN play to finish in first place in their third season in the ASUN. They defeated NJIT, Stetson, and Lipscomb in the championship game to win the ASUN tournament. 

The team officially qualified for the NCAA tournament but it was cancelled as a result of the global pandemic.

Departures

2020-21 Newcomers

Roster

Roster is subject to change as/if players transfer or leave the program for other reasons.

Schedule and results

|-
!colspan=12 style=|Non-conference regular season

|-
!colspan=12 style=| Atlantic Sun tournament
|-

|-
!colspan=12 style=| NCAA tournament

|-

References

Liberty Flames basketball seasons
Liberty
Liberty Flames basketball team
Liberty Flames basketball team
Liberty